María del Carmen Valenzuela (born June 16, 1956) is an Argentine actress. She has worked in several Argentine TV programs, mainly soap operas.

Biography 
Valenzuela played in many soap operas such as La cuñada, Vos y yo toda la vida, Barracas al sur, El infiel, El tema es el amor, Costumbres argentinas and Dulce Amor. She also appeared in some episodes of the TV program Alta comedia. She was married to the Argentine journalist Juan Carlos Mendizábal. She has three children with him. Mendizábal died of liver cancer in late 2011.

References

Living people
1956 births
Argentine actresses
Bailando por un Sueño (Argentine TV series) participants